Azovo (Aźaw) is a rural locality (a village) in Uzunlarovsky Selsoviet, Arkhangelsky District, Bashkortostan, Russia. The population was 461 as of 2010. There are 7 streets.

Geography 
Azovo is located 35 km northeast of Arkhangelskoye (the district's administrative centre) by road. Ravtau is the nearest rural locality.

References 

Rural localities in Arkhangelsky District